Roscoe is a city in central Edmunds County, South Dakota, United States. The population was 269 at the 2020 census.

Roscoe was laid out in 1877, and named in honor of Roscoe Conkling, a United States Senator from New York.

Geography
Roscoe is located at  (45.450306, -99.336783).

Roscoe has been assigned the ZIP code 57471 and the FIPS place code 55820.

Climate

Demographics

2010 census
As of the census of 2010, there were 329 people, 153 households, and 83 families residing in the city. The racial makeup of the city was 97.0% White, 0.9% African American, 0.3% Native American, and 1.8% from two or more races. Hispanic or Latino of any race were 4.6% of the population.

There were 153 households, of which 26.1% had children under the age of 18 living with them, 45.8% were married couples living together, 3.9% had a female householder with no husband present, 4.6% had a male householder with no wife present, and 45.8% were non-families. 42.5% of all households were made up of individuals, and 24.8% had someone living alone who was 65 years of age or older. The average household size was 2.15 and the average family size was 2.95.

The median age in the city was 38.2 years. 26.1% of residents were under the age of 18; 8% were between the ages of 18 and 24; 21% were from 25 to 44; 21% were from 45 to 64; and 24% were 65 years of age or older. The gender makeup of the city was 47.1% male and 52.9% female.

2000 census
As of the census of 2000, there were 324 people, 145 households, and 82 families residing in the city. The population density was 692.1 people per square mile (266.2/km2). There were 167 housing units at an average density of 356.7 per square mile (137.2/km2). The racial makeup of the city was 99.69% White, and 0.31% from two or more races. Hispanic or Latino of any race were 0.31% of the population.

There were 145 households, out of which 25.5% had children under the age of 18 living with them, 51.0% were married couples living together, 4.1% had a female householder with no husband present, and 42.8% were non-families. 38.6% of all households were made up of individuals, and 23.4% had someone living alone who was 65 years of age or older. The average household size was 2.23 and the average family size was 3.07.

In the city, the population was spread out, with 27.5% under the age of 18, 4.6% from 18 to 24, 24.7% from 25 to 44, 15.4% from 45 to 64, and 27.8% who were 65 years of age or older. The median age was 40 years. For every 100 females, there were 82.0 males. For every 100 females age 18 and over, there were 92.6 males.

The median income for a household in the city was $24,875, and the median income for a family was $36,250. Males had a median income of $27,500 versus $13,056 for females. The per capita income for the city was $16,451. About 2.9% of families and 8.9% of the population were below the poverty line, including none of those under age 18 and 13.8% of those age 65 or over.

Transportation
Roscoe is served by two major highways:
  (U.S. Route 12)
  (South Dakota Highway 247)

See also
 List of cities in South Dakota

References

External links

 

Cities in South Dakota
Cities in Edmunds County, South Dakota
Aberdeen, South Dakota micropolitan area
Populated places established in 1877
1877 establishments in Dakota Territory